Jean-Pierre Garen (10 November 1932 – 4 March 2004) was a French physician and author of soft science fiction novels about Mark Stone, agent of the Surveillance Service Of Primitive Planets.

1932 births
2004 deaths
French crime fiction writers
20th-century French physicians
French science fiction writers
French male novelists
20th-century French novelists
20th-century French male writers